Timia is a genus of flies in the family Ulidiidae, which is difficult to separate from the genus Ulidia.

Species

T. abstersa Loew, 1873
T. albiantennata Zaitzev, 1984
T. albifacies Gorodkov & Zaitzev, 1986
T. alini Hering, 1938
T. altaica Galinskaya, 2014
T. amoena Loew, 1874
T. anomala Becker, 1907
T. apicalis Wiedemann, 1824
T. arianica Gregor, 1970
T. asiatica Zaitzev, 1982
T. berlandi Séguy, 1953
T. beybienkoi Zaitzev, 1982
T. camillae Mik, 1889
T. canaliculata Becker, 1906
T. carbonaria Hendel, 1908
T. danieli Gregor, 1970
T. desparsata Enderlein, 1934
T. dimidiata Becker, 1906
T. emeljanovi Zaitzev, 1982
T. emiliae Zaitzev, 1982
T. erythrocephala Wiedemann, 1824
T. flaveola Galinskaya, 2011
T. gobica Zaitzev, 1982
T. golbeki Gorodkov & Zaitzev, 1986
T. gussakovskyi Gorodkov & Zaitzev, 1986
T. hirtipes Hendel, 1908
T. jakowlewi Hendel, 1908
T. kaszabi Zaitzev, 1982
T. kerzhneri Zaitzev, 1982
T. klugi Hendel, 1908
T. komarowii Mik, 1889
T. libani Gregor, 1970
T. melanorrhina Loew, 1866
T. mokhnata Galinskaya, 2014
T. mongolica Zaitzev, 1982
T. monticola Becker, 1906
T. nasuta Mik, 1889
T. nigriantennata Zaitzev, 1982
T. nigriceps Hendel, 1908
T. nigrimana Loew, 1866
T. nigripes Mik, 1889
T. nitida Hendel, 1935
T. orientalis Zaitzev, 1982
T. pamirensis Hennig, 1940
T. paramoena Hennig, 1940
T. parva Hendel, 1908
T. persica Hennig, 1965
T. planiceps Hendel, 1910
T. polychaeta Kameneva, 1996
T. problematica Hennig, 1965
T. protuberans Becker, 1906
T. pubescens Zaitzev, 1982
T. pulchra Roder, 1889
T. punctulata Becker, 1906
T. reitteri Hendel, 1908
 T. rugifrons
T. testacea Portschinsky, 1891
T. turgida Becker, 1906
T. xanthaspis Loew, 1868
T. xanthostoma Becker, 1907
T. zaitzevi Galinskaya, 2011

References

 
Ulidiidae
Brachycera genera
Taxa named by Christian Rudolph Wilhelm Wiedemann